The 1987–88 Lehigh Engineers men's basketball team represented Lehigh University during the 1987–88 NCAA Division I men's basketball season. The Engineers, led by third-year head coach Fran McCaffery, played their home games at Stabler Arena and were members of the East Coast Conference. They finished the season 21–10, 8–6 in ECC play to finish in fourth place in the conference.

Following the regular season, Lehigh won the ECC tournament to earn the conference's automatic bid into the 1988 NCAA tournament. This was their second NCAA Tournament appearance with their first coming in 1985. As a 16 seed, they fell to No. 1 seed Temple in the opening round.

Roster

Schedule

|-
!colspan=9 style=| Regular season

|-
!colspan=9 style=| ECC Tournament

|-
!colspan=9 style=| 1988 NCAA tournament

References

Lehigh Mountain Hawks men's basketball seasons
Lehigh
Lehigh
1987 in sports in Pennsylvania
1988 in sports in Pennsylvania